Lenro is a book sharing website that connected book readers on the local level so that they could borrow, lend or exchange books with each other. Members need to create a free account to borrow, lend or exchange books.

Site description 
Lenro users can search for a book to check its availability to borrow or could see all the books that are available near them. The website tells the user the distance to the other Lenro users nearby. Borrower can send a borrow request to the lender which the lender can either accept or reject. Members can communicate on Lenro chat and finalize a date, time, and venue to meet for the book exchange.

Members' profile page show the social profiles (such as Facebook and LinkedIn) of the member so that other users could have a look at those profiles to gain some level of trust before meeting for the first time. Members can also rate and review the books. The website has gamification points called Karma points. Members obtain points for activities like adding a book to lend, adding a book review, and borrowing/lending a book.

See also 
 Book swapping

References

External links 
 Lenro Official Website
 Lenro Blog

Book swapping
Indian social networking websites